Goranboy District is one of the 66 districts of Azerbaijan. It is located in the west of the country and belongs to the Ganja-Dashkasan Economic Region. The district borders the districts of Kalbajar, Tartar, Yevlakh, Samukh, and Goygol. Its capital and largest city is Goranboy. As of 2020, the district had a population of 105,000.

During the Soviet era, the region was best known for the oil-cure sanatorium resort of Naftalan, though administratively Naftalan counts as an independent city. Naftalan is now starting to operate again following several years of virtual inaction when the resorts were filled with refugees from the First Nagorno-Karabakh War.

Geography 
The relief of the region in the northeast is lowland, and in the southwest it is mountainous, crossed by gorges.  The terrain allows oil (including medical oil), limestone and clay to be extracted from minerals.

The subtropical dry, mild climate is common in this area. The average temperature ranges from -1 °C in winter to 26.5 °C in summer, with average rainfalls of 300–600 mm. Kura River and its flow are flowing through the region.

Etymology 
The region name is taken from the city of Goranboy which is the administrative centre of the district. This toponym is derived from the word Gerani (the river flowing through the city) and Boyahmedli (former name of the city). Over time, the particle “Ahmedli” was removed from the city's name.

History 
Goranboy District was established as an administrative district by decree of the Central Executive Committee of the Azerbaijan SSR on 8 August 1930. In the same year, the Armenian-majority Shahumyan District in what is now southern Goranboy was established by Decision 477 of the executive committee. In 1938, the district and its capital were renamed Gasim Ismailov (Qasım İsmayılov, in Russian Kasum-Ismailovski raion) after the Azerbaijani communist of the same name. The district and city were renamed Goranboy in 1991.

In 1991, during the early phases of the Karabakh conflict, together the Soviet leadership in Azerbaijan and Moscow decided to initiate a campaign of resettlement and disarmament under Operation Ring, where the Armenian residents of the region were deported to Soviet Armenia. Operation Ring was also named Operation Chaykend, the name of the prominent Armenian village of Getashen that fell in the eastern district of Khanlar (now Goygol).

Shahumyan District was merged with the Goranboy District in 1992 and has been repopulated by ethnic Azerbaijanis, most of whom are internally displaced persons who were deported from Nagorno-Karabakh and surrounding districts. The former district and is still claimed by the self-proclaimed Republic of Artsakh as part of its Shahumyan Province.

Population 
The population of the region is mainly Azerbaijanis as well as a small number of Russians, Ukrainians, and Belarusians.

Education 
There are 30 pre-school children enterprises, 80 secondary schools, 1 technical, secondary and vocational schools in Goranboy region.

Teachers examination in Barda city was held in April 2017, according to the Decree of the Minister of Education of 7 October 2016,  in connection with the execution of the Order No. 999 of the President of the Republic dated 16 January 2015.  2433 teachers participated in this examination.

Local economy 
Today, Goranboy belongs to Ganja-Kazakh economic region and main sector here is agriculture. Local folk is growing cotton, vegetables, grain, and viticulture. Furthermore, animal husbandry is also pretty common in this area. In Soviet Union times, 21 collective farms and 4 state farms were located in this region.

The institutions operating in the region as “Goran Pambig” a cotton processing company”, Goranboy-Wine” a wine-producing enterprise”, "Turk Yapı Senaye” construction company, “Gilan holding” construction company and others have a strong impact on the economy of the region and the country.

Also, the Baku-Qazakh highway, the Baku-Tbilisi railway, the Karadag-Agstafa-Tbilisi gas pipeline pass through the district.

Monuments 

 Khankarvend village mosque located Goranboy region was built in 2007 by local residents.
 Khudu baba Mausoleum is located in the Safikurd village of Goranboy.
 Gulustan Fortress

See also 
Administrative divisions of Azerbaijan

References

External links 
State Statistical Committee of Azerbaijan Republic. Population of Azerbaijan

 
Districts of Azerbaijan